The Iroquois Hotel New York is located at 49 West 44th Street between Fifth Avenue and Sixth Avenue in the Midtown Manhattan neighborhood of New York City. It is one of six hotels owned by Shimmie Horn and Gerald Barad under the Triumph Hotels brand. The hotel is part of Small Luxury Hotels of the World, a European-based referral service that sets standards for furnishings and service.

History 
The hotel was designed by Harry Mulliken from the architectural firm Mulliken & Moeller. It opened in October 1900 and included both an apartment house and a hotel. In its early years the hotel had a stable attached on the Fifth Avenue side of the building. During the Great Depression the hotel was able to maintain its reputation as a "refined, well-kept hotel". The Wigwam Bar opened at the hotel in 1939 and contained images of the pilgrims and Native Americans.

In 1949, the hotel was the headquarters of the National Council of the Arts, Sciences and Professionals. James Dean lived at the hotel for two years from 1951 to 1953 in room 83. Suite 803 is named after him. The female lead in Peter Link's Broadway musical Earl of Ruston (1971), Leecy R. Woods Moore, also temporarily lived at the property in 1971.

In 1996 Horn took over the ownership of the hotel, which had been in his family's possession since 1959. After a $13 million renovation in 1997, Horn affiliated the Iroquois with Small Luxury Hotels of the World.

References

External links 
 
 Triumph Hotels

Midtown Manhattan
Hotel buildings completed in 1900
Hotels established in 1900
Fifth Avenue
Hotels in Manhattan
1900 establishments in New York City